Marco Bortolotti and Arjun Kadhe were the defending champions but lost in the first round to Kaichi Uchida and Wu Tung-lin.

Sadio Doumbia and Fabien Reboul won the title after defeating Nicolás Mejía and Alexander Ritschard 6–2, 6–3 in the final.

Seeds

Draw

References

External links
 Main draw

Città di Forlì II - Doubles